Hermippus is a genus of ant eating spiders in the family Zodariidae, containing twelve species restricted to Asia and parts of Africa. Three new species were discovered in 2014.

Species
 Hermippus affinis Strand, 1906 — Ethiopia, Somalia
 Hermippus arcus Jocqué, 1989 — Tanzania
 Hermippus arjuna (Gravely, 1921) — India
 Hermippus cruciatus Simon, 1905 — India, Sri Lanka
 Hermippus gavi Sankaran et al., 2014 — India
 Hermippus globosus Sankaran et al., 2014 — India
 Hermippus inflexus Sankaran et al., 2014 — India
 Hermippus loricatus Simon, 1893 — Central, Southern Africa
 Hermippus minutus Jocqué, 1986 — Zimbabwe
 Hermippus schoutedeni Lessert, 1938 — Kenya
 Hermippus septemguttatus Lawrence, 1942 — South Africa
 Hermippus tenebrosus Jocqué, 1986 — South Africa

References

Zodariidae
Araneomorphae genera
Spiders of Asia
Spiders of Africa